Brett Gallant (born December 28, 1988) is a Canadian professional ice hockey player who is currently playing for the Cleveland Monsters in the American Hockey League (AHL).

Playing career
Gallant played junior hockey with the Summerside Western Capitals of the Maritime Junior A Hockey League (MJAHL). He was the team captain during the 2008–09 season when they won the Fred Page Cup, scoring 73 points in 50 games.

On November 20, 2009, the Syracuse Crunch signed Gallant to a professional tryout. After developing in the ECHL with the Elmira Jackals and the Reading Royals, Gallant signed a one-year contract with the Bridgeport Sound Tigers of the American Hockey League.

During his third season with the Bridgeport Sound Tigers in the 2012–13 season, Gallant was rewarded for his play in signing a one-year, entry level contract with NHL affiliate the New York Islanders on February 5, 2013.

Gallant was recalled by the New York Islanders from the Sound Tigers on April 7, 2014. He played four games in that stretch, recording three fights against noted heavyweights Matt Kassian, George Parros, and Zenon Konopka.

On July 2, 2015, Gallant signed as a free agent to a two-year, two-way contract with the Columbus Blue Jackets.

On April 8, 2016, during the Cleveland Monsters game against the Toronto Marlies, Gallant fainted while sitting on the bench during a TV time out and was removed from the game. He required operation on his heart before he could continue to play. Despite this setback, Gallant returned to the Monsters lineup for the 2016 Calder Cup Finals over the Hershey Bears, helping his team cinch the Calder Cup in four games.

On July 25, 2019, Gallant continued his tenure with the Monsters, agreeing to a two-year AHL contract extension. On May 14, 2021, Gallant surpassed Daniel Maggio to become the Monsters' career leader in penalty minutes.

Personal life
Gallant is the middle of two brothers who have also played hockey. His eldest brother Bradley played hockey in the QMJHL and the CHL. His youngest brother Alex also played in the American Hockey League and signed with the Vegas Golden Knights in 2018.  Alex is currently playing for the Calgary Wranglers.

Career statistics

Awards and honors

References

External links

1988 births
Bridgeport Sound Tigers players
Canadian ice hockey left wingers
Cleveland Monsters players
Elmira Jackals (ECHL) players
Ice hockey people from Prince Edward Island
Lake Erie Monsters players
Living people
New York Islanders players
People from Summerside, Prince Edward Island
Reading Royals players
Saint John Sea Dogs players
Syracuse Crunch players
Undrafted National Hockey League players
Canadian expatriate ice hockey players in the United States